The Asian Minifootball confederation, also referred to by its abbreviation AMFC, is the administrative body for 6-a-side version of minifootball in Asia. It is one of five continental confederations of World Minifootball Federation.

History
The AMFC's assembly was held on 1 February 2020 in Kuala Lumpur, Malaysia. The body was created and a new president, Mohammad Aldousari (president of the Saudi Minifootball Federation), was elected. The assembly has chosen Riyadh as federation seat. It also elected Lebanon's Ahmad Hassan Danash as first vice-president, and Saudi Mohammed Binjwajed as second vice-president.

Competitions
Asian Minifootball Championship

Major tournament records
 
 
 
 
 — Host(s)

WMF World Cup

WMF Continental Cup

U23 WMF World Cup

References

External links
WMF continental members - minifootball.com

Minifootball
Sports governing bodies in Asia
Sports organizations established in 2020
2020 establishments in Asia